Memories with Maya is a hard science fiction novel by the author Clyde Dsouza. It has been received well by the transhumanism and the science community. The novel looks at how augmented reality and AI will merge to augment human beings in ways that will affect emotions, intimate human relationships, and our evolution as a species.

Plot
The story is a first person narrative told through the eyes of protagonist Daniel (Dan). Dan lives life on his own terms, convinced that he can hack his destiny through the use of technology to better his condition. He believes that prayer is panacea for the weak and he can steer the course of his life through the use of logic, technology and science.

With his close friend Krish, they merge artificial intelligence and augmented reality technology to create the Wizer, a wearable visor much like Google Glass but powered by artificial general intelligence. The Wizer plays a key role in advancing the story and has uses in entertainment, sports, and even cyber sex via Dirrogates (a portmanteau of the words Digital and Surrogate, invented by the author)

Mid way through the story a dark side of Wizer technology and augmented reality comes to the front, with a major tragedy occurring in a nightclub. It changes the course of Dan and Krish's life. Dan experiences a loss that challenges him in no uncertain terms to prove he is capable of hacking his destiny. He faces internal turmoil, battling moral and ethical issues to emerge a transhuman, both in mind and body.

Reception
The Institute for Ethics and Emerging Technologies has featured the novel on their list of publications 

A writer for the IEET wrote an essay titled: Till Death do us part - The ethics and evolution of human relationships that interprets the reach of the technology described in the book and its effect on human relationships, even after death.

References

External links
 Dirrogate.com, the novel's website

2013 American novels
Books critical of religion
Indian science fiction novels
Hard science fiction
Transhumanist books
Augmented reality in fiction
Novels about artificial intelligence
Religion in science fiction
Smartglasses in fiction
Telepresence in fiction
Drones in fiction
Novels set in Mumbai
2013 science fiction novels
Postcyberpunk novels
Social science fiction
Fiction about resurrection
Novels about death
Fiction about memory
Self-published books